BioWare is a Canadian video game developer based in Edmonton, Alberta. It was founded in 1995 by newly graduated medical doctors Ray Muzyka, Greg Zeschuk and Augustine Yip, alongside Trent Oster, Brent Oster, and Marcel Zeschuk. Since 2007, the company has been owned by American publisher Electronic Arts.

BioWare specializes in role-playing video games, and achieved recognition for developing highly praised and successful licensed franchises: Baldur's Gate, Neverwinter Nights, and Star Wars: Knights of the Old Republic. They proceeded to make several other successful games based on original intellectual property: Jade Empire, the Mass Effect series, and the Dragon Age series. In 2011, BioWare launched their first massively multiplayer online role-playing game (MMORPG), Star Wars: The Old Republic.

History

Foundation

BioWare was founded by Ray Muzyka and Greg Zeschuk, alongside Trent Oster, his brother Brent, Zeschuk's cousin Marcel, and Augustine Yip. Of the founding team, Muzyka, Zeschuk and Yip had recently graduated from medical school at the University of Alberta, and had a background in programming for use in school. Together with Yip, they had created a medical simulation programme. The three also played video games for recreation, eventually deciding to develop their own. Their success in the medical field provided them with the funding they needed to launch a video game company. To make their first game, they pooled their resources, which resulted in capital of $100,000. The company was incorporated on 1 February 1995, though formally launched on 22 May 1995.

1990s: Shattered Steel and Baldur's Gate
Their first game, Shattered Steel, began its life as a proof-of-concept demo, similar to the MechWarrior games. This demo was submitted to ten publishers, seven of whom returned to the company with an offer. A publishing deal for Shattered Steel was eventually signed with Interplay Entertainment. Brent Oster and Trent Oster left BioWare at that time to form Pyrotek Studios, which continued developing Shattered Steel but broke up a year later, with Trent returning to BioWare to finish the game. BioWare's first game was released the following year. Shattered Steels release was described by IGN as a "modest success" with "decent sales". Two noteworthy points were the deformable terrain (player weapon damage caused craters in the environment) and zone damage (well-aimed gunfire could shoot mounted weapons off enemies). A sequel to Shattered Steel was planned for 1998 but never realized.

BioWare's founders and staff were keenly interested in both computerized and pen-and-paper variants of role-playing games. Their next development project, therefore, was determined to be a role-playing game. When Interplay financed "exploratory development", BioWare presented the publishers with a demo called Battleground: Infinity. Interplay suggested that the demonstrated gameplay engine would be well-suited to the Dungeons & Dragons licence which it had acquired from Strategic Simulations. Accordingly, Infinity was reworked in line with the Dungeons & Dragons ruleset.

The result was Baldur's Gate, with a development cycle of three years. During this time, the three doctors continued to practice medicine. The demands of development later prompted Muzyka and Zeschuck to leave medicine and move into full-time development. Augustine Yip decided to continue with his medical practice. Baldur's Gate sold more than two million copies after its release, nearly matching the sales of Diablo. Following the success of Baldur's Gate, the Infinity Engine was used for the games Planescape: Torment and the Icewind Dale series. The success of Baldur's Gate was followed by an expansion pack for the game: Tales of the Sword Coast.

2000s: EA acquisition, Mass Effect and Dragon Age

At this point, BioWare decided to return to the action genre. The company's initial thought was to develop a sequel to Shattered Steel, but eventually a sequel to MDK from Shiny Entertainment was chosen for development. MDK2 was released on PC, Dreamcast, and eventually PlayStation 2, offering BioWare their first taste of developing games for consoles. MDK2 drew the same level of praise as its predecessor but, despite the success, BioWare returned to the Baldur's Gate series for their next project.

Baldur's Gate II: Shadows of Amn was released in 2000, two years after the release of Baldur's Gate. Baldur's Gate II sold two million copies, matching the sales of the first game in the series. However, the success of both Baldur's Gate II and MDK2 was not enough to stabilize Interplay financially. Subsequently, BioWare began to work with Infogrames, which was later renamed to Atari. Neverwinter Nights was originally to be published by Interplay, but the company lost the licence of the game to Atari and part of their Dungeons & Dragons licence to BioWare. After selling their D&D licence to Atari, BioWare developed Star Wars: Knights of the Old Republic and Jade Empire. It had publishing relationships with Interplay Entertainment, Infogrames, under its new name Atari, LucasArts, and Microsoft.

The next few years saw a number of changes in BioWare's corporate status. In November 2005, it was announced that BioWare and Pandemic Studios (itself founded by former Activision employees) would be joining forces (with each maintaining their own branding), with private equity fund Elevation Partners investing in the newly named VG Holding Corp. partnership. On 11 October 2007, it was announced that VG Holding Corp. had been bought by Electronic Arts for million (equivalent to $ billion in ). BioWare therefore became a unit of EA, but still retained its own branding.

In 2007, BioWare released the science fiction role-playing game Mass Effect. The following year, BioWare released Sonic Chronicles: The Dark Brotherhood on the Nintendo DS, its first title for a handheld game console. Later, EA announced that BioWare would be merged with Mythic Entertainment, another division of EA, so that they could have all of their role-playing game development in one business unit.

The growth of the MMORPG group as part of Electronic Arts in 2008 resulted in three additional studios being added to the BioWare group outside BioWare's original home base in Edmonton. The first, located in Austin, Texas, and headed by industry veterans Gordon Walton and Richard Vogel, was created to work on the Star Wars: The Old Republic MMORPG project. Both the studio and the project were announced on 13 March 2006. On 2 March 2009, BioWare announced it had opened a new studio in Montreal, Quebec, to assist with existing projects as necessary.

During the mid-2000s, BioWare staff developed a number of video game projects which were ultimately canceled. A handheld spin-off for Mass Effect franchise titled Mass Effect: Corsair, inspired by the gameplay of Star Control and played from a first-person perspective, was briefly explored as a potential project for the Nintendo DS in 2008. A sequel to Jade Empire was under development at one point. The project transitioned into a spiritual successor codenamed Revolver, which was canceled by 2008. Trent Oster led a team which worked on a spy-themed role-playing game codenamed Agent prior to his second departure from BioWare in 2009. Unused concept art for Agent and Revolver are featured in the art book BioWare: Stories and Secrets from 25 Years of Game Development, published in January 2021.

On 24 June 2009, Electronic Arts announced a restructuring of their role-playing and massively multiplayer online games development into a new group that included both Mythic Entertainment and BioWare. Ray Muzyka, co-founder and general manager of BioWare, was appointed the Group general manager of this newly formed "BioWare Group". BioWare's other co-founder, Greg Zeschuk, became the Group Creative Officer for the new MMORPG studio group. BioWare's studios remained unchanged and continued to report to Muzyka. Near the end of 2009, BioWare released the critically acclaimed fantasy role-playing game Dragon Age: Origins.

2010s: Muzyka and Zeschuk's departure, Mass Effect on hiatus, Anthem

In January 2010, BioWare released the sequel to Mass Effect, Mass Effect 2, which would go on to receive critical acclaim and many awards. The company announced that it would be opening up a new customer service office in Galway, Ireland, in 2011. BioWare completed three major games between 2011 and 2012. The massively multiplayer online role-playing game (MMORPG) Star Wars: The Old Republic is based on BioWare's previous contribution to the Star Wars franchise, and was announced on 21 October 2008, although BioWare had first mentioned an unspecified new collaboration with LucasArts in October the previous year. The other games were Dragon Age II, the sequel to Dragon Age: Origins, and Mass Effect 3.

Following the release of Mass Effect 3 in March 2012, numerous players complained about its endings failing to fulfill the developer's earlier promises regarding the conclusion of the trilogy. In response to the controversy surrounding the game's ending sequence, BioWare announced on 5 April that they would reschedule their post-release content production and release an "Extended Cut" DLC that would expand the original endings and address the most common points of critique. The Extended Cut was released as a free download on 26 June 2012. On 18 September 2012, the next day after the official announcement of the third Dragon Age title, both Ray Muzyka and Greg Zeschuk, two of the remaining co-founders of BioWare, simultaneously announced they would be retiring from the gaming industry. After almost a year without a formal head, EA appointed Matthew Bromberg the group general manager of the BioWare label on 9 September 2013. Former CEO and president of Major League Gaming, Bromberg worked as the general manager of BioWare Austin since 2012; after his promotion, Jeff Hickman took over as the general manager in Austin. Aaryn Flynn remained in charge of BioWare Canada (Edmonton and Montreal) and Jon Van Caneghem, the head of Victory Games and Waystone Studio (also parts of the BioWare label).

After acquiring and dismantling LucasArts, The Walt Disney Company announced in May 2013 that Electronic Arts will produce future Star Wars games, "in addition to the BioWare team, which is already developing for the Star Wars franchise." In November 2013, teaser images from the next instalment of the Mass Effect series were released. At E3 2014, BioWare Edmonton announced working on a new (unnamed) original intellectual property in addition to continuing their established series. Another new IP, titled Shadow Realms is an episodic 4 vs. 1 story-driven online action role-playing game, and was announced on Gamescom 2014. On 9 February 2015, Bioware Austin announced that development on Shadow Realms would not continue.

Casey Hudson, the creator of the Mass Effect series, left BioWare in May 2014, while Drew Karpyshyn, writer of Star Wars: Knights of the Old Republic and the first two Mass Effect games, returned in 2015, Dragon Ages writer David Gaider left BioWare in January 2016. Chris Wynn and Chris Schlerf, both of whom had an important role in the development of Mass Effect: Andromeda, left in December 2015 and February 2016 respectively. Alexis Kennedy, co-founder of Failbetter Games and the creative director of Dragon Age: The Last Court, joined BioWare as its "first ever guest writer" in September 2016.

On 13 September 2016, EA announced the formation of EA Worldwide Studios, which would consist of BioWare Studios, EA Mobile, and Maxis, and led by DICE co-founder Patrick Soderlund. At the same time, Samantha Ryan, head of EA Mobile and Maxis, was appointed the new head of BioWare Studios. Released in March 2017, Andromeda was at the center of controversy of equal proportions, if not higher than that around the third chapter; starting with heavy criticisms that were addressed before the video game was released to the lukewarm response received by the specialized press and the fandom with sales lower than the previous Mass Effect chapters. Given the circumstances Electronic Arts has reportedly frozen the entire Mass Effect series, downgrading the BioWare Montréal branch from a leading development team to a support team, and later merging it into Motive Studios.

During EA's EA Play pre-E3 press conference on 10 June 2017, BioWare revealed Anthem, a new action role-playing game, with BioWare's story writer, Drew Karpyshyn, who previously worked on Mass Effect and Mass Effect 2, contributing to the new game. In July 2017, Aaryn Flynn, General Manager of BioWare, announced that he would depart from the company. Hudson returned to BioWare as its new General Manager. Lead story developer for Jade Empire and Dragon Age creative director Mike Laidlaw announced his departure from BioWare in October 2017 after 14 years with the company. James Ohlen, the lead designer of the Baldur's Gate series, Neverwinter Nights, Knights of the Old Republic, Jade Empire, and Dragon Age: Origins, as well as the game director of The Old Republic MMO, left the studio after 22 years in July 2018.

On 24 September 2019, it was announced that BioWare had moved from their old location on Calgary Trail into 3 stories of the Epcor Tower in downtown Edmonton.

2020s: Dragon Age 4, Mass Effect: Legendary Edition and Hudson/Darrah's departures

On 7 November 2020 or "N7 Day", a date first declared in 2012 by BioWare as an annual "worldwide celebration" of the Mass Effect franchise, Mass Effect: Legendary Edition was announced as well as an all-new entry to the franchise that had just started development.

On 3 December 2020, both Hudson and Mark Darrah, the executive producer on the Dragon Age series, announced their departures from the studio. Electronic Arts stated that work on the Mass Effect and Dragon Age games would still continue at the studio.

On 10 December 2020, a teaser trailer for the next Mass Effect game was shown at The Game Awards.

On 14 May 2021, Mass Effect: Legendary Edition was released on Microsoft Windows, PlayStation 4, and the Xbox One series.

Technology
Between 1998 and 2011, BioWare developed a number of in-house video game engines to serve as technical basis for their games. Some of these engines were then licensed to other companies to develop their own games. Others came with modding toolkits, allowing the fan community to implement original adventures using the technology of BioWare's games.

BioWare created the Infinity Engine to use it as a core component for development of 2D role-playing video games based on Dungeons & Dragons, the Baldur's Gate series (1998–2001). The engine was also used by Black Isle Studios to create the critically acclaimed Planescape: Torment (1999) and the Icewind Dale series (2000–2002). When Beamdog sought out a license from BioWare and started engineering enhanced versions of these games in 2012, they created an updated version Infinity Engine, referred to as the "Infinity Enhanced Engine" (alternatively Infinity Plus Engine or Infinity Bless Engine).

The  was the successor to the Infinity Engine, featuring full 3D environments, real-time lighting and shadows, and surround sound. BioWare used the Aurora Engine to produce their 2002 Neverwinter Nights, as well as two expansion packs. The game included the so-called "Aurora toolset", a collection of tools allowing users to create their own digital adventure modules to be played either in single-player or in online multiplayer. The toolset enjoyed great popularity among the modding community, with over a thousand fan-made modules produced in it within half a year after the release. Obsidian Entertainment (successor to Black Isle Studios) used an updated version of BioWare's Aurora, titled "Electron Engine", to produce Neverwinter Nights 2 (2006) and its three expansion packs (2007–2009). Like the original, the Electron toolset was released with the game. The Polish studio CD Projekt Red used the Aurora Engine to develop The Witcher, the 2007 video game adaptation of the Polish fantasy novel series, although the rendering module was rewritten from scratch.

BioWare used an updated version of the Aurora, titled the Odyssey Engine, to produce Star Wars: Knights of the Old Republic in 2003 and their first original intellectual property role-playing game Jade Empire in 2005. The Odyssey Engine was the first BioWare engine to allow developing for video game consoles, with both Knights of the Old Republic and Jade Empire originally released for the Xbox before being ported to the PC platform. Obsidian Entertainment used the Odyssey Engine to develop Star Wars Knights of the Old Republic II: The Sith Lords (2004), a sequel to the original Knights of the Old Republic. BioWare maintained limited oversight on Obsidian's development of The Sith Lords, as well as Neverwinter Nights 2.

The  succeeded the Odyssey Engine and, among other things, supported PhysX hardware acceleration. It was used to produce Dragon Age: Origins (2009) and its expansion pack (2010). Like Neverwinter Nights, Origins was released with a toolset to allow the players to run their own adventure modules on the Eclipse Engine. An upgraded version of the Eclipse Engine, internally known as the Lycium Engine, was used to produce Dragon Age II (2011).

In September 2004, BioWare acquired a license to use Unreal Engine 3 from developer Epic Games. Unreal Engine 3 would ultimately be used to develop the original Mass Effect trilogy (2007–2012), as well as the remastered Mass Effect: Legendary Edition in 2021.

In 2013, EA confirmed that all future games developed by BioWare will be made on DICE's Frostbite engine. All three of BioWare's latest games (Dragon Age: Inquisition, Mass Effect: Andromeda and Anthem) were developed on Frostbite 3 as part of the general move towards a unified technology foundation across all of Electronic Arts' development studios.

Subsidiaries
 BioWare Austin in Austin, Texas; formed in March 2006 specifically to develop Star Wars: The Old Republic (with assistance from BioWare Edmonton), BioWare Austin later began working on a new IP called Shadow Realms, but production was shelved in February 2015 in order to focus on the continuing production of Dragon Age: Inquisition and The Old Republic.

Former
 BioWare Montreal in Montreal, Quebec; formed in March 2009 to assist the Edmonton studio where necessary. Led the development of DLC for the Mass Effect series as well as Mass Effect: Andromeda. BioWare Montreal was merged with EA's Motive Studio in August 2017.
 BioWare San Francisco in San Francisco, California; founded as EA2D and developed Mirror's Edge 2D and Dragon Age: Legends, became part of BioWare, but was closed in February 2013.
 BioWare Mythic in Fairfax, Virginia; formerly known as Mythic Entertainment, until June 2009, re-renamed to Mythic Entertainment in November 2012 and closed completely in 2014.
 Victory Games in Los Angeles, California; founded in February 2011 as BioWare Victory to develop the 2013 Command & Conquer, it had since dropped the BioWare label in November 2012 but remained part of the BioWare group. The studio dissolved in October 2013.
 Waystone Games in Los Angeles, California; the developer of Dawngate, which was cancelled in November 2014.
 BioWare Sacramento in Sacramento, California; founded as KlickNation 2008, acquired and renamed BioWare Sacramento in 2011, and renamed EA Capital Games in 2014.

Games developed

Awards and recognition
The full list of awards can be found on their web site.
 Spike TV's 2010 Video Game Awards: Studio of the Year (2010)
 Hall of Fame induction (2010)

In addition to numerous game awards, in October 2008, the company was named one of Alberta's Top Employers by Mediacorp Canada Inc., which was announced by the Calgary Herald and the Edmonton Journal.

BioWare's co-founders Ray Muzyka and Greg Zeschuk were named as members of the Order of Canada in December 2018 "for [their] revolutionary contributions to the video game industry as a developer and co-founder of an internationally renowned studio."

References

External links
 

 
1995 establishments in Alberta
Companies based in Edmonton
Electronic Arts
2007 mergers and acquisitions
Canadian companies established in 1995
Video game companies established in 1995
Video game companies of Canada
Canadian subsidiaries of foreign companies